Serra Talhada Futebol Clube, commonly known as Serra Talhada, is a Brazilian football club based in Serra Talhada, Pernambuco state.

Founded on February 25, 2011, is the successor to Serrano Futebol Clube, inactive since 2010.

History
The club was founded on February 25, 2011. They won the Campeonato Pernambucano Second Level in 2011, thus they were promoted to the 2012 Campeonato Pernambucano.

Stadium
Serra Talhada plays their home matches at the Estádio Nildo Pereira de Menezes, which has a capacity of 7,000 seats.

Achievements

 Campeonato Pernambucano Second Level:
 Winners (1): 2011

Current squad (some players)

Performance competitions

Campeonato Pernambucano - Série A2

References

External links
Official website 

Football clubs in Pernambuco
Association football clubs established in 2011
2011 establishments in Brazil